Switzerland competed at the 2002 Winter Olympics in Salt Lake City, United States.

Medalists

Alpine skiing

Men

Men's combined

Women

Women's combined

Biathlon

Men

Men's 4 × 7.5 km relay

 1 A penalty loop of 150 metres had to be skied per missed target. 
 2 Starting delay based on 10 km sprint results. 
 3 One minute added per missed target.

Bobsleigh

Men

Women

Cross-country skiing

Men
Sprint

Pursuit

 1 Starting delay based on 10 km C. results. 
 C = Classical style, F = Freestyle

4 × 10 km relay

Women
Sprint

Pursuit

 2 Starting delay based on 5 km C. results. 
 C = Classical style, F = Freestyle

4 × 5 km relay

Curling

Men's tournament

Group stage
Top four teams advanced to semi-finals.

|}

Medal round
Semi-final

Bronze medal game

Contestants

Women's tournament

Group stage
Top four teams advanced to semi-finals.

|}

Medal round
Semi-final

Gold medal game

Contestants

Figure skating

Men

Women

Ice Dancing

Freestyle skiing

Men

Women

Ice hockey

Men's tournament

Preliminary round - group B
Top team (shaded) advanced to the first round.

Consolation round
11th place match

Luge

Men

Nordic combined 

Men's sprint

Events:
 large hill ski jumping
 7.5 km cross-country skiing 

Men's individual

Events:
 normal hill ski jumping
 15 km cross-country skiing 

Men's team

Four participants per team.

Events:
 normal hill ski jumping
 5 km cross-country skiing

Skeleton

Men

Women

Ski jumping 

Men's team large hill

 1 Four teams members performed two jumps each.

Snowboarding

Men's parallel giant slalom

Men's halfpipe

Women's parallel giant slalom

Women's halfpipe

References
Official Olympic Reports
International Olympic Committee results database
 Olympic Winter Games 2002, full results by sports-reference.com

Nations at the 2002 Winter Olympics
2002
Winter Olympics